The 1993–94 Michigan Wolverines men's basketball team represented the University of Michigan in intercollegiate college basketball during the 1993–94 season. The team played its home games in the Crisler Arena in Ann Arbor, Michigan, and was a member of the Big Ten Conference.  Under the direction of head coach Steve Fisher, the team finished second in the Big Ten Conference.  The team earned an invitation to the 1994 NCAA Division I men's basketball tournament as a number three seed and advanced to the fourth round. The team was ranked for the entire eighteen weeks of Associated Press Top Twenty-Five Poll, starting the season ranked fifth, peaking at number three and ending ranked eleventh, and it also ended the season ranked eleventh in the final USA Today/CNN Poll.  The team went 6–6 against ranked teams including the following victories: November 26, 1993, against #13  80–70 in the Tipoff Classic in Springfield, Massachusetts, January 29, 1994, against #16 Wisconsin 79–75 at home, February 1 against #8 Purdue 63–62 on the road, February 8 against #12 Indiana 91–67 at home, February 19 against #20 Minnesota 72–65 at home, and March 19 against #12 Texas in the 1994 NCAA Division I men's basketball tournament 84–79 at Kansas Coliseum.

Juwan Howard and Jason Bossard served as team co-captains, while Howard shared team MVP honors with Jalen Rose.  The team's leading scorers were Jalen Rose (636 points), Juwan Howard (625 points), and Jimmy King (358 points).  The leading rebounders were Juwan Howard (270), Ray Jackson (195), and Jalen Rose (182).

The team surpassed the 1986 team’s single-season total of 265 steals with 267 to establish the current school record.

Regular season
In November 2003, Mitch Albom released his book Fab five: basketball, trash talk, the American dream chronicling the recruiting of and first two years of play of the Fab Five. After Chris Webber left for the NBA, the team entered the season ranked fifth in the nation as it opened the season against number 13 . Michigan found itself with a 21–6, (13–4 Big Ten) record and tied with the Purdue Boilermakers for the conference lead with one game remaining. Michigan then lost (for the third time in its last four games) to a struggling  team, and finished second in the conference. After the season, Howard was selected as a first team All-Big-Ten member along with Glenn Robinson, Rose, Shawn Respert, and Damon Bailey. In the second round, Howard posted 34 points and 18 rebounds to lead the team to an 84–79 victory over Texas. Michigan faced a Joe Smith-led Maryland in the Sweet Sixteen round. Howard scored 24 and had 11 rebounds before fouling out with 2:49 remaining in the 78–71 victory. Howard earned the regional MVP award with a game-high 30 points and 13 rebounds despite collecting two fouls in the first two minutes in the Elite Eight round against a victorious Arkansas team that had United States President Bill Clinton as a vocal supporter. After the season, Howard announced his intention to enter the 1994 NBA Draft. The following day, Rose announced he would enter the draft as well.

Schedule and results

|-
!colspan=9 style=| Non-conference Regular Season

|-
!colspan=9 style=| Big Ten Regular Season

|-
!colspan=9 style=| NCAA Tournament

Rankings

Team players drafted into the NBA
Four players from this team were selected in the NBA draft.

See also
1994 NCAA Division I men's basketball tournament
NCAA Men's Division I tournament bids by school
NCAA Men's Division I tournament bids by school and conference
NCAA Division I men's basketball tournament all-time team records

References

Michigan Wolverines men's basketball seasons
Michigan
Michigan
Michigan
Michigan